The 1997 Tour de Langkawi was the second edition of the Tour de Langkawi, a cycling stage race that took place in Malaysia. It started on 13 February in Kota Kinabalu and ended on 24 February in Langkawi. The race was sanctioned by the Union Cycliste Internationale (UCI) as a 2.5 category race.

Italian Luca Scinto won the race, Jens Voigt of Germany second and Alberto Elli third. Scinto also won the points classification and mountains classification of the race.  won the team classification of the race.

Stages
The cyclist competed in 12 stages over 12 days, covering a distance of 1,538 kilometres.

Final standings

General classification

References

Tour de Langkawi
Tour de Langkawi
Tour de Langkawi